Walter von Unruh (30 December 1877 Gut Klein Tillendorf bei Fraustadt – 16 September 1956 in Bad Berneck im Fichtelgebirge) was a Prussian officer, and later General during World War II. Also, he was a recipient of Pour le Mérite.

Awards
 Iron Cross (1914), 1st and 2nd class
 Pour le Mérite (21 April 1918)
 Gallipoli Star (Ottoman Empire) ("Iron Crescent")
 Honorary Knights of St. John
 Knight's Cross of the Royal House Order of Hohenzollern with Swords
 Prussian Service Award
 Military Merit Order, 3rd class (Bavaria)
 Knight's Cross, First Class of the Albert Order with swords
 Knight's Cross of the Military Merit Order (Württemberg)
 General Honour Decoration for Bravery (Hesse)
 Hanseatic Cross of Hamburg
 Knight's Cross, First Class of the Order of the White Falcon with swords (Weimar)
 Knight's Cross of the Order of Leopold with War Decoration (Austria)
 Order of the Iron Crown, 3rd class with War Decoration (Austria)
 Military Merit Cross, 3rd class with War Decoration (Austria-Hungary)
 Knights Cross of the War Merit Cross with Swords (1943)

References
 Karl-Friedrich Hildebrand, Christian Zweng: Die Ritter des Ordens Pour le Mérite des I. Weltkriegs, Band 3: P–Z, Biblio Verlag, Bissendorf 2011, S. 451-453
 Hanns Möller: Geschichte der Ritter des Ordens pour le mérite im Weltkrieg, Band II: M–Z, Verlag Bernard & Graefe, Berlin 1935, S. 442-444

External links
 

1877 births
1956 deaths
People from Wschowa County
German Army generals of World War II
Generals of Infantry (Wehrmacht)
German Army personnel of World War I
People from the Province of Posen
Major generals of the Reichswehr
Prussian Army personnel
German prisoners of war in World War II held by the United States
Recipients of the Pour le Mérite (military class)
Recipients of the Knights Cross of the War Merit Cross
20th-century Freikorps personnel